Filmworks VI: 1996 features three scores for film by John Zorn. The album was released on Zorn's own label, Tzadik Records, in 1996. It features the music that Zorn wrote and recorded for Anton, Mailman (1996), a short film directed by Dina Waxman that was never completed due to loss of funding in its final stages, Mechanics of the Brain (1996) directed by Henry Hills and The Black Glove (1996), which was directed by, and starred, Maria Beatty.

Reception
The Allmusic review by Stacia Proefrock awarded the album 3 stars:

Track listing
Anton, Mailman (1996, directed by Dina Waxman):
1/ Opening Credits/Hawaiian Postcard        -                   2:57
2/ Work-A-Day World (Anton's Theme)         -                   3:31
3/ Seductress                               -                   4:18
4/ End Titles                               -                   3:09

Recorded at Baby Monster Studio, New York City on July 15, 1996
Marc Ribot – guitar
Greg Cohen – bass
Cyro Baptista – percussion
John Zorn – alto.

Mechanics Of The Brain (1996, directed by Henry Hills):
5/ Fireworks                                -                   1:52
6/ Surgery Montage                          -                   1:47
7/ Brain Scan                               -                   1:05
8/ Witches' Cauldron                        -                   3:47
9/ Houdini                                  -                   3:12
10/ Subliminal Perceptions                  -                   1:45
11/ Measuring                               -                   1:34
12/ MacBeth                                 -                   3:05
13/ Pendulum                                -                   2:05
14/ Mechanics Of The Brain                  -                   1:58

Recorded at Shelley Palmer Studio, New York City on March 1, 1996
Mark Feldman – violin
Erik Friedlander – cello
Marc Ribot – guitars
Ikue Mori – drum machines
John Zorn – sound effects
Jason Baker (13) – voice

The Black Glove (1996, directed by Maria Beatty):
15/ Part One (Hot)                          -                  19:47
16/ Part Two (Cold)                         -                   7:44

Recorded at Shelley Palmer Studio, New York City on March 31, 1996
John Zorn – sound design.

All compositions by John Zorn
Produced by John Zorn

References

Tzadik Records soundtracks
Albums produced by John Zorn
John Zorn soundtracks
1996 soundtrack albums
Film scores
Soundtrack compilation albums
Tzadik Records compilation albums